Dad for a Day is a 1939 Our Gang short comedy film directed by Edward Cahn. It was the 184th Our Gang short (185th episode, 96th talking short, 97th talking episode, and 16th MGM produced episode) that was released.

Plot
While planning to participate in the annual Fathers and Sons Day Picnic, the Our Gang kids are reminded that their pal Mickey has no father. The kids prevail upon friendly gas-station owner Mr. Henry to act as Mickey's surrogate dad during the festivities. Not only does Mr. Henry win every competition, but he also works up enough nerve to propose to Mickey's widowed mother.

Cast

The Gang
 Mickey Gubitosi as Mickey Baker
 George McFarland as Spanky
 Carl Switzer as Alfalfa
 Billie Thomas as Buckwheat
 Leonard Landy as Leonard

Additional cast
 Darwood Kaye as Club member complimenting Mickey
 Arthur Q. Bryan as Spanky's dad
 Ben Hall as Leonard's dad
 Tom Herbert as Gas station patron
 Louis Jean Heydt as Bill Henry, Mickey's surrogate dad
 Milton Parsons as Mr. Kincade, father of triplets
 Peggy Shannon as Mary Baker, Mickey's mother
 Mary Treen as Receptionist
 Walter Sande as Extra
 James Gubitosi as Club member
 Tommy McFarland as Club member
 Harold Switzer as Club member

See also
 Our Gang filmography

References

External links
 

1939 films
1939 comedy films
American black-and-white films
Films directed by Edward L. Cahn
Metro-Goldwyn-Mayer short films
Our Gang films
1939 short films
1930s English-language films
1930s American films